El espíritu de la música is an 1832 Argentine book by Juan Bautista Alberdi. It is the first work of the author, who wrote it during his studies.

References
 

1832 books
Books by Juan Bautista Alberdi